The Waupun Correctional Institution is a maximum security penitentiary in Waupun, Wisconsin. The prison is under the command of Warden Randall Hepp.

History
On July 4, 1851, Governor Nelson Dewey selected the Waupun area to be the site of the Wisconsin State Prison. A temporary structure opened in 1851. It could hold a maximum of 40 inmates, and was intended to be used only until the completion of a wing of the main prison. By December 31, 1852, 27 inmates were held there. The first permanent building was completed in 1854, and is still in use today as the South Cell Hall. According to the Commissioner of the State Prison, it was to be constructed of stone using prison labor. Additions were made over the years in 1855, 1906, 1913, 1940, and 1998. The prison was added to the National Register of Historic Places as the "Wisconsin State Prison Historic District" in 1992.

18th Biennial Report
In 1918, Warden Henry Town reported a decrease in the prison population over a two-year period. The number had dropped from 906 in 1916 to 853 in 1918.  Between 20 and 30 percent of that number were employed outside of the prison.  They lived in bunkhouses or at a residence at one of the prison's farms.  Foreman and superintendents supervised their work instead of armed guards, but nine prisoners did escape, with only two being apprehended.  In the spring and summer of 1917, the prison operated six road construction camps with approximately 15 workers per camp.  Prisoners were also assigned to construction projects, such as the Industrial Home for Women at Taycheedah and the Southern Wisconsin Home for the Feeble Minded and Epileptic at Union Grove, Wisconsin.  In 1918, the prison did not assign any men for road work.  Instead, more were scheduled for farm labor to support the war effort.  The Wisconsin State Prison operated a number of farms as part of its rehabilitation program for prisoners.  It owned 367 acres of land in the town of Chester, 400 acres in the town of Trenton, and rented 960 acres with another 657 acres arranged to be rented by October 1, 1918.  Total farm revenues reported on June 30, 1918 were $32,151.84, which was used to offset the costs of running the prison.  The prison also operated a cannery for the farm products, a shoe factory, and planned to construct a license plate factory.

26th Biennial Report
26 years later, Warden Oscar Lee reported that as of June 30, 1934, the male population of the prison increased to 1664 inmates, with 438 of them assigned to work outside the prison. Ten outdoor camps were in operation, three of them logging operations. Lee argued that "The value to the inmates, both physical and mental, because of the fresh air and sunshine, the clean, wholesome outdoor work, and the semi-freedom of the camps, cannot be estimated in dollars and cents." He also reported that the prison began using less harsh punishment for violating rules. Prisoners were no longer handcuffed to cell doors. Lee boasted that "Corporal punishment is a thing of the past, stripes and red uniforms following suit." Likewise, enhanced opportunities to earn an education were also reported. By 1934, inmates could attend class 40 hours per week at eight hours per day. 148 men enrolled, and a University of Wisconsin employee directed the educational system there. Teachers were from the prison population. A new apprenticeship program was also initiated that combined school work with work in the machine and sheet metal shops. Twenty inmates enrolled, and they spent half their day in a shop and the other half in school. Prison guards worked between 11 and 12 hours per shift, and Warden Lee proposed to have that number reduced to eight.

Notable current and former inmates
John Flammang Schrank - attempted presidential assassin of President Theodore Roosevelt.
Steven Avery - murderer, guilty of killing Teresa Halbach in 2005, Netflix series Making a Murderer depicted his conviction and appeal process.
Gerald M. Turner (nicknamed "The Halloween Killer") - convicted of raping and murdering 9-year-old trick-or-treater, Lisa Ann French in 1973, Imprisoned in Waupun Correctional Institution from 1975 to 1992.
Gary Hirte - convicted of murdering Glen Kopitske in 2003.
Daniel Bartelt - convicted of murdering Jessie Blodgett in 2013
William Floyd Zamastil - Serial Killer convicted for the 1978  abduction, rape, and murder of a 24-year-old woman in Madison, Wisconsin. Later convicted in 2004 for the 1978 bludgeoning deaths of Jacqueline Bradshaw, 18, and her 17-year-old brother Malcolm, in California,  and in 2011 for the 1973 first-degree murder of Leesa Shaner in Arizona.
Brian Flatoff- Suspect in the December 2015 Neenah hostage situation and officer involved critical incident.
Antonio "Tino" Barbeau - 13-year-old convicted of a brutal first-degree intentional homicide along with his friend Nathan "Nate" Paape of his great-grandmother Barbara Olson in August of 2013 and sentenced to life in prison without the possibility of parole until the year 2048.
David Van Dyke - serial killer who murdered six people in Milwaukee between 1979 and 1980.

Other information
There has never been an execution in the prison, as Wisconsin abolished capital punishment the year before construction of the facility.

On December 3, 2001, Warden Gary Mcaughtry (retired 2004) hired the first Pagan Priestess (Rev. Jamyi J. Witch SMW) to serve as one of the institution's two acting chaplains.

See also 
 List of Wisconsin state prisons

References

External links 
Waupun Correctional Institution website
LIFE IN WISCONSIN PRISONS AND BEYOND

Prisons in Wisconsin
Buildings and structures in Dodge County, Wisconsin
Jails on the National Register of Historic Places in Wisconsin
Historic districts on the National Register of Historic Places in Wisconsin
1851 establishments in Wisconsin
National Register of Historic Places in Dodge County, Wisconsin